Junun may refer to:

Junun (album), a 2015 album by Shye Ben Tzur, Jonny Greenwood, and the Rajasthan Express
Junun (film), a 2015 documentary about the making of the album

See also
 Junoon (disambiguation)